Maurizio Malagnini is an Italian composer who lives in London.

Career
Maurizio Malagnini is a composer based in London, who earned a master's degree with honors from the Royal College of Music in 2008. Since then, Malagnini has composed the music for many episodes of television for BBC One. In 2015 his score to The Paradise has been recognized with an Emmy Nomination, and has been hailed as a "masterpiece of musical storytelling." Broadcast in 132 territories, The Paradise earned Malagnini international recognition, including three Music + Sound Awards. Afterwards, he composed the music for the fourth, the fifth and the sixth season of the period drama Call the Midwife. His recent projects include the ITV Movie Peter & Wendy and The C Word, a BBC TV-movie based on the book and blog by Lisa Lynch. Malagnini is currently composing the music for the seventh season of Call the Midwife.

Works for television

Awards

Primetime Emmy Awards
 2015: The Paradise Outstanding Original Music in a Series (nomination)

The Music + Sound Awards, International
 2015: Call the Midwife Best Original Composition Television Score 
 2014: The Paradise Best Original Composition Television Score
 2013: The Paradise Best Original Composition Television Score 

The Music + Sound Awards, UK
 2014: The Paradise Best Original Composition Television Program Score

Televisual Bulldog Awards, UK
 2015: The Paradise Best Music (nomination) 

International Film Music Critics Association Awards
 2021: Coppelia Film Score of the Year

References

External links
Official Website (archived)

Living people
Italian film score composers
British male film score composers
Year of birth missing (living people)